Archdiocese of Tuam may refer to:

 Roman Catholic Archdiocese of Tuam, a Roman Catholic archdiocese in west Ireland
 Archdiocese of Tuam (Church of Ireland), a former archdiocese that lasted until 1839
 Diocese of Tuam, Killala and Achonry, present-day successor to the Church of Ireland archdiocese